The Order of Merit of the Kingdom of Hungary was established on 14 June 1922 by Miklós Horthy the Regent of the  Kingdom of Hungary. On 23 December 1935 it was transformed into an official distinction. Since then it has been known as Order of Merit of the Kingdom of Hungary. After the Hungarian monarchy was abolished, on 14 September 1946 the National Assembly of Hungary disestablished the order and replaced it by the Order of Merit of the Republic of Hungary. After the promulgation of the new Hungarian constitution on  20. August 1949, the order was disestablished. After the collapse of the communist regime in Hungary, the order was reestablished as the second-highest distinction of the country. Since 2012 the official name is Order of Merit of Hungary.

Originally the order was instituted as the Order of Merit in three grades: gilt, silver and bronze. Eventually the order was expanded to include the following seven classes: Collar, Grand Cross with Holy Crown, Grand Cross, Grand Commander, Commander, Officer and Knight.

History 
The Order of Merit of the Kingdom of Hungary was established on 14 June 1922 by the Regent of the Kingdom of Hungary, Vice Admiral Miklós Horthy. After its establishment, the rules of the order were changed numerous times. On 23 December 1935 it became an official distinction recognizing both civil and military accomplishments. From on 1939 to 1944 the highest degree of the order, the Grand Cross with the Holy Crown of Stephen (Istvan), was awarded to both chiefs of state (i.e. monarchs of presidents) or heads of government (i.e. prime ministers and chancellors). In addition, the class of the Holy Crown and the Collar was instituted which was awarded exclusively to chiefs of state. All classes of the order could be awarded in recognition of military distinction, the military "division" of the order having crossed swords and a different ribbon which was mostly red rather than the green of the civil division.

After the Hungarian monarchy was formally abolished following the abdication of Admiral Horthy and the defeat of Hungary in World War II, on 14 September 1946 the National Assembly of Hungary disestablished the order and replaced it by the Order of Merit of the Republic of Hungary. After the Communist take over of Hungary and the promulgation of the new Hungarian constitution on  August 20, 1949, the new order was disestablished.

Following the collapse of the Communist regime in Hungary in 1989 a new order, known as Order of Merit of Hungary, was established. Though it has a similar appearance, this is a new order and not a re-establishment of the previous order.

Recipients
 Vice Admiral Miklós Horthy
 Grand Admiral Erich Raeder
 Pasha Sherif Sabri

Society of Hungary
Orders, decorations, and medals of Hungary